The Play-offs of the 2007 Fed Cup Asia/Oceania Zone Group I were the final stages of the Zonal Competition involving teams from Asia and Oceania. Using the positions determined in their pools, the ten teams faced off to determine their placing in the 2007 Fed Cup Asia/Oceania Zone. The team that placed first overall advanced to the World Group II.

Promotion play-offs
The top team of each pool was placed against each other in a head-to-head round. The winner of the round advanced to World Group II for next year.

Thailand vs. Chinese Taipei

Third to Fourth play-offs
The second-placed teams from each pool were drawn in head-to-head rounds to find the third and fourth placed teams.

Uzbekistan vs. India

Fifth to Sixth play-offs
The third-placed teams from each pool were drawn in head-to-head rounds to find the fifth and sixth placed teams.

Hong Kong vs. New Zealand

Seventh to Eighth play-offs
The fourth-placed teams from each pool were drawn in head-to-head rounds to find the seventh and eighth placed teams.

South Korea vs. Kazakhstan

Ninth to Tenth play-offs
The fifth-placed teams from each pool were drawn in head-to-head rounds to find the ninth and tenth placed teams.

Singapore vs. Jordan

Final Placements

  advanced to the World Group II Play-offs, and were drawn against , where they lost 2–3. The team thus fell back to Group I for the next year.

See also
Fed Cup structure

References

External links
 Fed Cup website

2007 Fed Cup Asia/Oceania Zone